The Laguna College, more popularly known by its initials LC, is a private, nonsectarian, co-educational institution located in San Pablo City, Laguna, Philippines. It offers elementary, junior high school, senior high school, college, graduate studies.

History
Don Zacarias Sahagun and Don Melecio Fule founded the Laguna Academy in 1923 to provide secondary schooling to the people of San Pablo City and its neighboring towns.

The Laguna Academy, considered the largest provincial private secondary institution in Luzon up to the outbreak of the recent war, was established as a solution to one of the pressing educational problems of the times. In 1923, Don Zacarias Sahagun, seeing the increasing number of poor but ambitious youth of the then town of San Pablo and its vicinities who could not pursue secondary education in the provincial public high school for economic reasons, was moved to action. He conferred with his friend, the late Don Melecio Fule. They pooled their efforts and created the Laguna Academy. The academy began with 16 students and reached an enrollment of 1,500 in 1941.

Upon the death of the first two presidents of the board of trustees and co-founders of the institution, Don Melecio Fule and Don Zacarias Sahagun (a municipal president of San Pablo who was responsible for the opening of a town government hospital), one of the academy's alumni in the person of Dr. Nicasio B. Sahagun, physician and educator, took the reins of the school administration in 1938. He and Mr. Alfredo Evangelista, treasurer of the institution, with the moral and material support of the other members of the board exerted much effort in the establishment of a junior normal college, bringing opportunities for higher education nearer the door of every home in San Pablo and the neighboring provinces. The war of 1941, however, forced the closing of the Laguna Academy and it remained closed during the years of the Japanese occupation.

With the liberation of the city of San Pablo in 1945, the academy resumed its educational mission. Amid tremendous handicap, for the institution had all its equipment and facilities damaged and its buildings destroyed during the war, the board of trustees reopened the institution. Under its new name, Laguna College, it offers kindergarten, elementary, special science curriculum and RBEC-based high school, college, and graduate school courses which, together, make up a student population of several thousands.

In 1996, it was granted Accreditation Status (Level II) for its courses in liberal arts, education, and commerce by the Philippine Association of Colleges and Universities - Commission on Accreditation (PACU-COA). It was re-accredited Level II in 2005.

Gallery

Academic programs

College degree programs
Bachelor of Science in Accountancy (BSA)
Bachelor of Science in Management Accounting (BSMA)
Bachelor of Science in Accounting Information Systems (BSAIS)
Bachelor of Science in Business Administration (BSBA)
Major in Financial Management
Major in Operations Management
Major in Marketing Management
Major in Human Resource Management
Major in Business Economics
Bachelor of Science in  Industrial Engineering (BSIE)
Bachelor of Science in Civil Engineering (BSCE)
Bachelor of Science in Nursing
Bachelor of Arts in Economics
Bachelor of Arts in  English
Bachelor of Elementary Education 
Major in Mathematics
Major in Science
Major in Health Education
Bachelor of Secondary Education 
Major in English
Major in Filipino
Major in General Science
Major in Home Economics and Technology
Major in Mathematics
Bachelor of Science in Computer Science
Bachelor of Science in Information Technology
Bachelor of Science in Psychology
Bachelor of Science in Hotel and Restaurant Management
Bachelor of Science in Tourism Management

Graduate degree programs
Master in Business Management
Thesis Program
Non-Thesis Program
Master in Public Administration
Master of Arts in Education 
Major in Administration and Supervision
Major in Educational Management
Major in Mathematics
Major in Reading

Senior high school
ABM Strand
STEM Strand
HUMSS Strand

High school
Special SCIENCE Curriculum (SSC)
Science Enriched Curriculum
Regular Curriculum 
Grades 7-12

Grade school
Kindergarten
Grades 1-6

Short-term courses
General Clerical Science
Diploma in Junior Secretarial
Computer Technology Course
Office Management with Computer
Nursing Aide
Graduate in Midwifery
Associate in Arts
Associate in Commercial Science
ICTC-Programming Course
ICTC-PC Operation Course

Organizations
Laguna College Supreme Student Council
Laguna College Accounting Society (An Affiliate of National Federation of Junior Philippine Institute of Accountants)
Laguna College Management Society
Laguna College Educators' Circle
Laguna College Association of Psychology Students
Computer Science Council
Glee Club
Science Club
Math Club
English Communication Arts Club

External links
 Laguna College Official website

High schools in Laguna (province)
Universities and colleges in Laguna (province)
Education in San Pablo, Laguna